Hello is the debut album by the American singer-songwriter Poe. It was released in 1995 on Modern Records.

Background
Aside from the Detroit studio of album producer RJ Rice, the recording of Hello took place at a variety of studios in Los Angeles.

The first music video for the album was for the single "Angry Johnny"; it featured Poe on the skeletal frame of a bed looking forlorn whilst destroying a variety of effects one might associate with romance (like roses or a box of chocolates). The song's rage-filled lyrics quickly found her being lumped into the "angry female rocker" category, and the video was heavily played on MTV's Alternative Nation. The second single, "Hello", did not fare as well, until a remix version was released two years after the album's initial release. At least one other track (Junkie) was remixed as well, since the 1999 CD-quality download of 'Hello' contains a version of 'Junkie' with more instrument layers (horns and warbly guitar) that is 6 seconds shorter than the 3:06 original.

Hello was certified gold by the Recording Industry Association of America on November 20, 1996.

Critical reception
Trouser Press wrote that "Poe has enough personality to keep the pleasant and occasionally intriguing album her own, but not enough to make it a strong statement." MusicHound Rock: The Essential Album Guide called the album "a mess of over-personal, overproduced folk songs," aside from "Trigger Happy Jack" and "Angry Johnny." Tulsa World wrote that Poe "rips and rocks, but she doesn't kick out the jams at the expense of the songcraft." Glen Ballard in an interview on Spotify's Landmark series quoted "Around the time, I was making this record Jagged Little Pill, I heard some tracks by an artist named Poe. I heard a couple of these things and it really blew my mind. As much as anything, the Poe record, "Hello", was probably the biggest influence I had at that time, honestly, because it was a brilliant record that had jazz influence, hip hop, electronic, rock. It was a hybrid of the first degree."

Track listing
All lyrics are written by Poe.

Sample credits
"Fingertips" contains a vocal sample from "Like a Lover" as performed by Sérgio Mendes and Brasil '66.

Personnel
Credits adapted from CD liner notes.

Musicians

Poe – vocals (all tracks), piano (11), programming (8), additional programming (7)
Richard Barrow – flute (11)
Alex Blanc – guitar (9)
Jon Brooks – drums (3)
Lionel Cole – programming (2, 8)
Jeffrey Connor – bass guitar (2, 3, 5, 9), bass programming (1), guitar (3)
Ronnie Estelle – programming (1)
Amp Fiddler – keyboards (8)
Eric Garcia – guitar (9), keyboards (9)
Karl Givens – trumpet (8)

Joey Grossman – guitar (5)
Sean Uberoi Kelly – bass (6), guitar (6), programming (6)
Dean Pleasants – guitar (2)
RJ Rice – keyboards (7), programming (5, 7, 10)
Matt Sorum – drums (2, 9)
Cameron Stone – cello (4)
Jeffery L. Walker, Jr. – keyboards (6), additional keyboards (8), keyboard programming (5), additional programming (10)
Tony Wilson – guitar (1, 3)
Jay Dee – programming (8)

Technical

Poe – production (3, 4, 9, 11), co-production (1, 2, 6, 7), editing, mixing (3, 4, 11)
Jeffrey Connor – production (3), co-production (2)
Dave Jerden – executive production, production (2), engineering (1, 8), mixing (1, 2, 8)
RJ Rice – production (1, 5-8, 10), engineering (1, 5, 6, 8, 10), mixing (5, 6, 10)
Richard Barrow – engineering (4, 11)
James Beaty – engineering assistance (8)
Alex Blanc – editing, engineering (3)

Brian Carlstrom – engineering (1)
Annette Cisceros – engineering assistance (1, 8)
Amanda Cruz – engineering assistance (5, 6, 8, 10, production coordination
Eric Garcia – editing, engineering (3), mixing (9)
Steve Klein – engineering (2, 8), mixing (2, 8)
Eddy Schreyer – mastering
Slam – engineering assistance (5, 6, 8, 10)

Design
Beau Barton – art direction, design, cover photography
Thomas Bricker – art direction, design, additional photography
Amanda Cruz – photography
Marty Levin – back cover photography
Poe – lyric collages

Chart positions
Album – Billboard (US)

Singles – Billboard (US)

References

1995 debut albums
Poe (singer) albums
Albums produced by Dave Jerden
Contemporary R&B albums by American artists